Ralph Howard may refer to:
Ralph Howard, 7th Earl of Wicklow (1877–1946), Irish aristocrat and politician
Ralph Howard, 1st Viscount Wicklow (1726–1786), Anglo-Irish politician and nobleman
Sir Ralph Howard, 1st Baronet (1801–1873) of the Howard baronets
Ralph Howard (politician) (1931–2013), Australian politician
Ralph Anthony Howard, member of the Alabama House of Representatives
Ralph Howard, radio broadcaster and Howard Stern Show team member